The Socialist Party of Mexico is a political party in Mexico, founded in 2001. It is led by Rafael Aguilar Talamantes.

The party contested the 2001 municipal election in Tlaxcala, obtaining 328 votes. In the municipality of San Pablo del Monte it obtained 160 votes (0.8%). In the 2002 elections to municipal presidents in Guerrero, it obtained 2118 votes. In the elections to local deputies, it obtained 2449 votes.

In 2004 the Aguilar declared that the party had become active on the national level.

References

2001 establishments in Mexico
Political parties established in 2001
Political parties in Mexico
Socialist parties in Mexico